This is the list of fictional characters who have appeared in Raj Comics as the enemies of Raj comics superhero Super Commando Dhruva. Dhruva has one of the most recognisable rogues gallery in Indian comic book genre. Over the years, Dhruva has fought many villains ranging from normal human beings to costumed villains, from supervillains to aliens, comedic villains and tricksters to demons and god-like beings and sometimes even other superheroes who have gone rogue. Some of Dhruva enemies have subsequently turned towards the good side. On some occasions, Dhruva has also fought against supervillains who are arch foes of other Raj Comics superheroes.

Classic rogues gallery
List of Dhruva's prominent foes including super-villains and themed criminals in alphabetical order (with issue and date of first appearance).

Foes of lesser renown
In alphabetical order (with issue and date of first appearance)

Teams and organizations

Minions and henchmen
The following is the list of henchmen and minions, who worked for Dhruva's enemies, in alphabetical order (with issue and date of first appearance)

See also

Dhruva